Toxabramis swinhonis is a species of ray-finned fish in the genus Toxabramis. It is found in the Yangtze, Yellow, and other rivers in China.

References 

Toxabramis
Freshwater fish of China
Fish described in 1873
Taxa named by Albert Günther